Tara Joy Berrett ( Croxford, born January 7, 1968, in Winnipeg, Manitoba) is a former field hockey player from Canada. She represented her native country at the 1992 Summer Olympics in Barcelona, Spain, where she ended up in seventh place with the Canadian National Team. She is married to veteran race walker and former Olympian Tim Berrett.

References

External links
 
 
 

1968 births
Living people
Canadian female field hockey players
Olympic field hockey players of Canada
Field hockey players at the 1992 Summer Olympics
Pan American Games silver medalists for Canada
Pan American Games bronze medalists for Canada
Pan American Games medalists in field hockey
Field hockey players at the 1991 Pan American Games
Field hockey players at the 1995 Pan American Games
Field hockey players from Winnipeg
Medalists at the 1991 Pan American Games
Medalists at the 1995 Pan American Games